Syed Mohammed Arif (born 29 January 1944), popularly known as Arif Saahab, is an Indian badminton coach. He is a recipient of Dronacharya Award and Padma Shri Award by the Government of India.

Early life
S. M. Arif is from Hyderabad, Telangana. He received his B.Sc. from University of Hyderabad. He also played cricket at School, led Anwar ul Uloom college for four years and played for Deccan Blues in the HCA league. He quit after being sidelined by his cricket coach and pursued badminton.

Career
S. M. Arif, during his college days, won the inter-varsity badminton championship by representing University of Hyderabad. He also represented Andhra Pradesh in several national tournaments.

He earned a diploma in badminton coaching from National Institute of Sports at Patiala. In 1974, he joined the national panel of coaches for badminton and in 1997 he was appointed as the National Chief Badminton Coach. Arif coached several Indian badminton players, including the former All England Badminton Champion Pullela Gopichand, the former Indian National Badminton champions P. V. V. Lakshmi, Jwala Gutta, and Saina Nehwal.

Awards
  Dronacharya Award,  Government India for his contribution to Indian Badminton - 2000. 
 Meritorious certificate award, Badminton World Federation
 Padma Shri - 2012

References

Racket sportspeople from Hyderabad, India
Indian sports coaches
Recipients of the Dronacharya Award
1944 births
Living people
Badminton in India
Recipients of the Padma Shri in sports
Badminton coaches
Indian badminton coaches